The Church of St Mary the Virgin and All Souls, Bulwell is a parish church of the Church of England in Nottinghamshire, England.

The church is Grade II listed by the Department for Digital, Culture, Media and Sport as it is a building of special architectural or historic interest.

History
The church was built on the site of an earlier church, dating from possibly the 12th century. This church was badly damaged by a storm in 1843.

It was constructed between 1849 and 1850 and the architect was Henry Isaac Stevens. The church was consecrated on 4 November 1850 by the Right Revd. Dr. Kaye, Bishop of Lincoln. The chancel was added in 1900 by William Arthur Heazell. The north chapel was added in 1946.

Organ
A new organ was opened in 1852 by George Cooper, the assistant organist of St Paul's Cathedral. The current pipe organ dates from 1872 by Forster and Andrews. In 1899 a new organ chamber was built to house the organ and move it from its location in the north transept. A specification of the organ can be found on the National Pipe Organ Register.

Bells
The tower contains eight bells all by John Taylor and Company of Loughborough dating from 1919/20 and 1860.

Clock
The 90-year-old clock was replaced by a new one by G. & F. Cope with an all-electric mechanism in 1949.

Sources

External links
See St Mary's Church on Google Street View

Churches in Nottingham
Grade II listed churches in Nottinghamshire
Church of England church buildings in Nottinghamshire